Kolumbusplatz is an U-Bahn station in Munich on the U1 and U2 of the Munich U-Bahn system.

See also
List of Munich U-Bahn stations

References

Munich U-Bahn stations
Railway stations in Germany opened in 1980
1980 establishments in West Germany